Caudalie is a French skincare company, specialized in Vinotherapy. It is known for its skincare products harnessing extracts from the grape and grapevine and has since become known for its Vinotherapy Spas.

History 

Caudalie takes its name from the unit of measurement, the Caudalie, pronounced ko-da-li, used in oenology, the study of wine.

In 1993, during the harvest at Château Smith Haut Lafitte, Mathilde Thomas and her husband Bertrand Thomas met Professor Joseph Vercauteren, a polyphenols specialist from the Pharmacy University in Bordeaux and his research team. Mr.Vercauteren shared one of his discoveries with them - that PCOs (procyanidolic oligomers) extracted from grape-seeds, are significantly more effective than vitamin E against free radicals.

In 1995, Mathilde and Bertrand Thomas launched Caudalie by developing a range of three products containing stabilized grape-seed polyphenols with unique anti-aging properties.

In 1996, Caudalie signed a research agreement with the Bordeaux Pharmacy Faculty and created a dedicated team of researchers, leading to the development of two further patents, Resveratrol and Viniferine. 

In September 1999, Mathilde and Bertrand Thomas created their first Vinothérapie Spa in the grounds of Château Smith Haut Lafitte. This unique spa concept combines water from a natural hot water spring with extracts from grapes and the grapevine. 

Early in 2013, Caudalie opened its first boutique in Brazil.  

In 2015, Caudalie filed a new patent following the scientific breakthrough of combining vine stalk Resveratrol with hyaluronic acid. This also marked the launch of a new anti-ageing range, Resveratrol[Lift]. 

In 2017, Caudalie opened its New York flagship boutique 'La Maison Caudalie' in the Meatpacking District, NYC.

In 2018, Caudalie opened its Natural Formulation Laboratory as well as a new, eco-designed logistics site in Gidy, near Orleans, France.

In 2018, Caudalie launched Vinopure, a new range designed specifically for oily, blemish-prone skin types. The range was awarded a Marie Claire Prix d'excellence de la Beauté in 2019.

In 2019, Caudalie launched a new generation of eco-friendly suncare products in support of Coral Guardian, a company which plants corals in Indonesia.

Economics 

Caudalie is an independent and family-owned business. In 2018, Mathilde Thomas was presented with a French Legion of Honor award by Prime Minister, Edouard Philippe, for her entrepreneurial achievements and commitment to creating products which are both eco-friendly and highly effective.

Laboratory & Research 
Caudalie has its own Natural Formulation Laboratory situated in Gidy, France and works in partnership with Harvard Medical School and anti-ageing guru, Dr David Sinclair, to develop patents to combat skin ageing.

Caudalie also follows a strict ingredients charter named its “cosm-ethics” charter, which bans the use of phthalates, phenoxyethanol, mineral oils, parabens, Sodium Laureth Sulfate, synthetic colouring agents as well as ingredients of animal origin in its product formulas.

Ecological Commitments 
Since 2012, Caudalie has been a member of the "1% for the Planet" network and thus contributes 1% of its worldwide turnover to organisations committed to protecting the environment.

Caudalie also supports various associations such as the WWF, Surfrider, Nordesta, Pur Projet, NFF, Coeur de Foret and is committed to planting 8 million trees by 2021.

Products 

Caudalie offers products for face, body and hair. The brand favours natural, active ingredients that respect the environment while harnessing the benefits of the grapevine and grapes.

Distribution 

Caudalie's products are sold in over 27 countries worldwide:

 In Europe, in pharmacies
 In America, in Sephora, Blue Mercury and other points of sale
 In Asia, in Sephora as well as department stores

The brand also has 8 Vinotherapie Spas as well as more than 36 Boutique-SPAs around the world.

References

External links 
 
 Caudalie on Twitter

Skin care
Cosmetics companies of France
French brands
Personal care brands
Chemical companies established in 1995
Companies based in Bordeaux